Pentoxide may refer to:

Antimony pentoxide, Sb2O5
Arsenic pentoxide, As2O5
Carbon pentoxide, CO5
Dinitrogen pentoxide, N2O5
Iodine pentoxide, I2O5
Niobium pentoxide, Nb2O5
Phosphorus pentoxide, P4O10
Tantalum pentoxide, Ta2O5
Tungsten pentoxide, W18O49